The May 1989 tornado outbreak occurred on May 5, 1989. The outbreak spawned 16 tornadoes in Georgia, South Carolina, North Carolina and Virginia, and was responsible for a combined total of $169 million in damage in the four states. It also caused 7 deaths and 168 injuries.

Confirmed tornadoes

Sources:

Georgia and South Carolina

The first tornadoes of this outbreak were reported between 1 and 2 P.M. near Gainesville, Georgia and Toccoa, Georgia.  During the mid-afternoon, severe storms began moving northeast into the northwest corner of South Carolina, spawning additional tornadoes in Oconee County.

The first violent tornado of the day, otherwise known as the Chesnee F4 Tornado, formed around 5:20 pm. in Spartanburg County in South Carolina north of Boiling Springs and southwest of Chesnee.  Along its 15-mile path to Henrietta in Rutherford County, North Carolina it killed two people and injured 35 others. The first casualty was a 66-year-old man who died when a chimney fell onto him. The other was a 59-year-old woman who died attempting to flee her mobile home.  In addition, it caused significant damage to several commercial buildings and outbuildings in Spartanburg.  After the tornado crossed the state line near Montgomery Drive into North Carolina it caused further damage to three mobile homes, one business, and four permanent residences (one of which was constructed with brick).  In total, the Chesnee F4 Tornado caused approximately $3 million in property damage.

North Carolina and Virginia
Other F4 tornadoes soon formed just to the north (on a path from northern Cleveland County to southwest of Hickory), and also in Union County, southeast of Charlotte.  The Cleveland-Lincoln-Catawba tornado caused 30 injuries and $20 million in property damage in the Belwood community, before then causing 4 fatalities and 19 additional injuries in the Toluca community in northwestern Lincoln County. Weaker tornadoes were noted in the NC foothills near Lenoir, and the Union County supercell later spawned F1 tornadoes in nearby Anson and Stanly counties.

Later in the afternoon, a strong F3 tornado produced $25 million in damage on a southwest-to-northeast path through the city of Winston-Salem.  Damage from this storm was visible along Business I-40 and US 421 in southwest Winston-Salem. The historic Old Salem area was also hard hit; many century-old trees in Salem Square and God's Acre were heavily damaged by the winds and had to be removed. Due to the difficulty in getting heavy equipment into the cemetery Gods Acre, those trees were removed by a helicopter. In the surrounding areas of Forsyth County, North Carolina, two other tornadoes were confirmed between 5:30 and 6:15 P.M.  Strong winds associated with the same squall line downed a radio transmission tower in nearby High Point. Winds toppled large trees and caused roof damage in the Emerywood neighborhood of the city. At about the same time, a series of weaker and short-lived tornadoes nonetheless also managed to produce $27.5 million in damage in northern Durham and southwest Granville counties.

Later in the evening, the last two tornadoes of the outbreak produced minor damage in Louisa County, between Richmond and Charlottesville.

Ultimate toll
Large hail and wind damage reports were widespread – golf-ball sized hail was recorded near Columbia, South Carolina and Monroe, North Carolina, with severe wind reports from over 100 counties from Georgia to Maryland.  Some form of storm damage was noted in almost every North Carolina county between I-95 and the Blue Ridge Mountains.

See also
 List of North American tornadoes and tornado outbreaks

References

F4 tornadoes by date
 ,1989-05-05
Tornadoes of 1989
Tornadoes in Georgia (U.S. state)
 ,1989-05-05
 ,1989-05-05
 ,1989-05-05
1989 natural disasters in the United States
1989 in Georgia (U.S. state)
1989 in North Carolina
1989 in South Carolina
1989 in Virginia
May 1989 events in the United States